Ox gall is gall, usually obtained from cows, that is an ingredient in bile soap and mixed with alcohol and used as the wetting agent in paper marbling, engraving, lithography, and watercolor painting. It is a greenish-brown liquid mixture containing cholesterol, lecithin, taurocholic acid, and glycocholic acid.

References

External links 
 http://www.winsornewton.com/news/making-water-thick-or-thin-gum-arabic-and-ox-gall
 http://www.neogen.com/acumedia/pdf/ProdInfo/7216_PI.pdf
 http://www.usbio.net/item/O8175

Animal glandular products
Surfactants